The Onomasticon compiled by  Eusebius of Caesarea (more properly, On the Place-Names in the Holy Scripture, Peri tōn topikōn onomatōn tōn en tē Theia Graphē, in Greek) is a directory of place names, or "gazetteer", a primary source that provides historical geographers with a contemporary knowledge of early 4th-century Palestine and Transjordan. It sits uneasily between the ancient genres of geography and lexicography, taking elements from both but serving as a member of neither. It is, according to many, the most important book for the study of Palestine in the Roman period.

Background 
Eusebius' description of his own method, who wrote: "I shall collect the entries from the whole of the divinely inspired Scriptures, and I shall set them out grouped by their initial letters so that one may easily perceive what lies scattered throughout the text," implies that he had no similar type of book to work from; his work being entirely original, based only on the text of the Bible. Others have suggested that Eusebius had at his disposal early Roman maps of the Roman Empire with which to work, and which allowed him to record the precise distances between locations in Roman miles. Needless to say, this innovation has been very useful to modern research. Of the approximate 980 Biblical and New Testament names of places contained in those works, Eusebius identifies some 340 with locations known in his own day and age. 

The primary source for the Onomasticon is Codex Vaticanus, Gr. 1456 which dates from the 11th or 12th century. Klostermann published a scientific edition of the manuscript in 1904, using in addition four other manuscripts. Dependent upon the Codex Vaticanus manuscript is Codex Parisinus Gr 464 which dates from the 16th century. These two manuscripts were edited and published by Lagarde in 1870. 

Eusebius organizes his entries into separate categories according to their first letters. The entries for Joshua under Tau, for example, read as follows: 
Tina (Kinah, 15:22): of the tribe of Judah.
Telem (15:24): of the tribe of Judah.
Tessam ([Azem] 15:29): of the tribe of Judah.
Tyre ([Zer] 19:35): of the tribe of Naphthali.

Under each letter, the entries are organized first by the book they are found in, and then by their place in that book. In almost all of the entries in his geographical opus, Eusebius brings down the respective distances in Roman "milestones" (semeia) from major points of reference, such as from Jerusalem, Beit Gubrin (Eleutheropolis), Hebron, Ptolemais, Caesarea, etc. In Eusebius' Onomasticon, distances between each "milestone" were usually 1,600 meters–1,700 meters, although the standard Roman mile was 1,475 meters. Since most villages in the Onomasticon are far removed from Roman-built roads, scholars have concluded that Eusebius did not glean the geographical information from maps based on a milestone survey, but rather collected the information from some other source.

Where there is a contemporary town at the site or nearby, Eusebius notes it in the corresponding entry. "Terebinth", for example, describes Shechem as "near Neapolis", modern Nablus, and "Tophet" is located "in the suburbs of Jerusalem".

Date 
The Onomasticon has traditionally been dated before 324, on the basis of its sparse references to Christianity, and complete absence of remarks on Constantine the Great's buildings in the Holy Land. The work also describes traditional religious practices at the oak of Mamre as though they were still happening, while they are known to have been suppressed soon after 325, when a church was built on the site. Eusebius references the encampment of the Legio X Fretensis at Aila (in southern Israel, near modern Aqaba and Eilat); the X Fretensis was probably transferred from Jerusalem to Aila under Diocletian (r. 284–305).

Jerome provided a Latin translation of Eusebius' Onomasticon, which Jerome translated in anno 388 CE while living in Bethlehem. Jerome's Latin edition includes various designations, based on the different manuscripts available to him. This Latin version of Eusebius' Onomasticon became the main source for research of Israel in the west. The edition published by Paul de Lagarde includes the Latin work compiled by Jerome under the title, Hieronymi de situ et nominibus locorum hebraicorum liber.

Language 
Eusebius compiled his work in Greek, although a Latin translation of the Onomasticon was made by Jerome in little over half-a-century later. Greco-Roman referents are used by Eusebius in his Onomasticon for Hebrew names, such as Ailia for Jerusalem, Nicopolis for Emmaus, Diospolis for Lydda (Lod), Eleutheropolis for Beit Gubrin, Azotus for Ashdod, Jamnia for Yavne, Neapolis for Shechem, Scythopolis for Beit Shean, Diocaesarea for Sepphoris, Philadelphia for Amman, and Ptolemais for Acco.

Demographics 
The complete demographic diversity of Israel in the 4th-century CE is not fully known. However, Eusebius who lived in Beit Gubrin (Eleutheropolis) speaks briefly about the country's ethnic make-up, principally, in the area of the country in which he was most familiar. Out of fourteen entries where he mentions the town's ethnic details, eleven of these settlements were Jewish, namely: Ekron, Anea (thought to be Khirbet Ghuwein et-Taḥta, now a ruin), Debir , En-Gedi, Eshtemoh, Hormah, Thalca, Juttah, Nineveh , Naarah, and Carmel (mentioned incidentally to Ziph); one a Samaritan village: Tirzah (Thersila) in Batanaea; and two Christian settlements: Anaea and Jattir. The town Debir , being "Dabeira on Mount Thabor, in the borders of Diocaesarea" in Lower Galilee had a sizable Jewish population.

Published editions of Eusebius' Onomasticon
 (2nd ed. 1887; reprinted in Hildesheim: Georg Olms, 1966)
(In this edition the Greek and Latin texts do not appear in parallel but in succession: first Latin, then Greek. The editor provides the material with references to biblical and other sources, without introductory notes and commentary)
 (reprinted in Hildesheim: Georg Olms, 1966. )
(The first critical edition of the Onomasticon)

(Provides an English translation both of the Greek text by Eusebius and of the Latin translation by Jerome)

(A triglott edition - in Greek, Latin, and English, with notes and commentary)
 Wolf, Carl Umhau (1971). Eusebius of Caesarea, Onomasticon

References

External links
 C. Umhau Wolf, The Onomasticon of Eusebius Pamphili - Compared with the Version of Jerome and Annotated (PDF) 
 The Onomasticon of Eusebius of Caesarea and the Liber Locorum of Jerome - Translated by G. S. P. Freeman-Grenville
 Eusebius of Caesarea, Onomasticon (1971 translation)

4th-century Christian texts
4th-century history books
Ancient Greek geographical works
Greek-language books
Works by Eusebius of Caesarea
Holy Land during Byzantine rule
Textual scholarship
History of the Levant
Oral tradition
Ancient sites in Israel
Land of Israel
Historical geography
Ancient Jewish history
Geography of Israel
Palestine (region)
Biblical places
Old Testament places
New Testament places
Toponymy